In mathematics, an ordinary differential equation is called a Bernoulli differential equation if it is of the form

 

where  is a real number. Some authors allow any real , whereas others require that  not be 0 or 1. The equation was first discussed in a work of 1695 by Jacob Bernoulli, after whom it is named. The earliest solution, however, was offered by  Gottfried Leibniz, who published his result in the same year and whose method is the one still used today.

Bernoulli equations are special because they are nonlinear differential equations with known exact solutions. A notable special case of the Bernoulli equation is the logistic differential equation.

Transformation to a linear differential equation
When , the differential equation is linear. When , it is separable. In these cases, standard techniques for solving equations of those forms can be applied.
 
For example, in the case , making the substitution  in the differential equation  produces the equation , which is a linear differential equation.

Solution
Let  and

be a solution of the linear differential equation

Then we have that  is a solution of 

Example
Consider the Bernoulli equation 

(in this case, more specifically a Riccati equation).
The constant function  is a solution. 
Division by  yields

Changing variables gives the equations

which can be solved using the integrating factor

Multiplying by 

Applying the chain rule and integrating both sides with respect to  results in the equations

Notes

References 
 .
 .

External links 
 Index of differential equations

Ordinary differential equations